() is a naval rank used in some navies.

Finland

Germany

The German term Bootsmann translates to Boatswain, i.e. the senior crewman of the deck department.

In a military context,  Bootsmann  (Btsm or B) is the lowest Portepeeunteroffizier (NCO with portepeé) rank in the German Navy. It belongs to the particular rank group Senior NCOs with port épée. It is grouped as OR6 in NATO, equivalent to Petty Officer First Class in the US Navy, and to Petty Officer in the British Royal Navy.

In navy context NCOs of this rank were formally addressed as Herr Bootsmann also informally / short Bootsmann.

The sequence of ranks (top-down approach) in that particular group is as follows:
Unteroffiziere mit Portepee
OR-9: Oberstabsbootsmann / Oberstabsfeldwebel
OR-8: Stabsbootsmann / Stabsfeldwebel
OR-7: Hauptbootsmann / Hauptfeldwebel
OR-6a: Oberbootsmann / Oberfeldwebel
OR-6b: Bootsmann / Feldwebel

Latvia

Netherlands

Poland

Russia

See also
 Ranks of the German Bundeswehr
 Rank insignia of the German Bundeswehr
 Ranks and insignia of NATO navies enlisted

References 

Naval ranks of Germany
Military ranks of Russia

de:Bootsmann